WTKY may refer to:

 WTKY-FM, a radio station (92.1 FM) licensed to Tompkinsville, Kentucky, United States
 WTKY (AM), a radio station (1370 AM) licensed to Tompkinsville, Kentucky, United States